Hezi Shayb was born in Israel. Currently, commencing 2018, he is the CEO of the Israeli Vehicle Importers Association.  In his previous positions, he served, inter alias, as the  CEO of Opel Israel and Chairman of New Kopel Group Romania. Commencing 2017 he is an Associate Professor in Bucharest Academy of Economic Studies. He is a professional strategist in crisis management, with a long experience in assessing risks, managing crises and mitigating them. He is a graduate of the Naval Combat Officers Academy and a Major retired from the Israeli Defense Forces. He has almost 20 years of experience as CEO in the Insurance and Automotive industry. Between 2009 and 2012 he was the manager of three times winner of the Women World Boxing Championship, Hagar Finer.    In 2016, he was named “The CEO with the most dynamic growth” in Romania by Business Magazine. He was also honored by Business Magazine as one of the “Top 100 Most Admired CEOs in Romania” in 2016. He has a PhD in Risk Management. In 2021, he published Enterprise Crisis Management, presenting an applicable advanced algorithm for early detection, prevention and mitigation of risks for a wide range of organizations, considered to be a breakthrough in the field.

References

Living people
Romanian businesspeople
Israeli businesspeople
Boxing managers
1963 births